Ikoko-Impenge (also transliterated as Ikoko-Ipenge or Ikoki-Impenge) is a village situated 30 kilometers to the south-east of the market town of Bikoro in the Province of Équateur of the Democratic Republic of the Congo. Although Ikoko-Impenge is accessible by road, it is difficult to reach in the rainy season, and lacks mobile telephone connectivity.

The village is in Ikoko health area. In 2018, a police officer who died in a health centre in Ikoko-Impenge is believed to have been the first known victim of the 2018 Équateur province Democratic Republic of the Congo Ebola virus outbreak.

References 

Populated places in the province of Équateur